Khanamir (also Romanized as Khānamīr and Khān Amīr) is a village in Yengejeh Rural District of Howmeh District, Azarshahr County, East Azerbaijan province, Iran. At the 2006 census, its population was 1,803 in 449 households. The following census in 2011 counted 2,239 people in 637 households. The latest census in 2016 showed a population of 2,381 people in 723 households; it was the largest village in its rural district.

References 

Azarshahr County

Populated places in East Azerbaijan Province

Populated places in Azarshahr County